Germany was represented by Margot Hielscher, with the song '"Für zwei Groschen Musik", at the 1958 Eurovision Song Contest, which took place on 12 March in Hilversum, Netherlands.  "Für zwei Groschen Musik" was chosen at the German national final held on 20 January.  This was Hielscher's second consecutive Eurovision appearance for Germany.

Before Eurovision

National final 
The national final was held on 6 February at the Kleine Westfalenhalle in Dortmund, hosted by Anaid Iplikjan and Kurt A. Jung.  Twelve songs took part, with the winner being decided by a jury.  Only two song titles with performers are currently confirmed:  the winning song and "Die Braut der sieben Meere" by Lale Andersen.  The remaining performers were:  Evelyn Künnecke, Erni Bieler, Fred Bertelmann, Gitta Lind, Vico Torriani, John Paris, Margret Fürer, Georg Thomalla, Peter Lorenz and Fred Weyrich.

At Eurovision 
On the night of the final Hielscher performed 8th in the running order, following Belgium and preceding Austria.  Hielscher's performance in 1957, when she had sung into a telephone receiver, is credited as the first to introduce a visual performance element into Eurovision, and she followed this in 1958 by appearing onstage wearing a tiara and a sash proclaiming her 'Miss Juke Box', while manoeuvring a stack of records in her hands as she sang.  At the close of voting "Für zwei Groschen Musik" had received 5 points, placing Germany 7th of the 10 entries.  The German jury awarded 5 of its 10 points to Belgium.

Voting 
Every country had a jury of ten people. Every jury member could give one point to his or her favourite song.

References 

1958
Countries in the Eurovision Song Contest 1958
Eurovision